Late Night Berlin (abbreviated LNB) is a German late-night talk show hosted by Klaas Heufer-Umlauf on ProSieben. The show premiered on March 12, 2018, and is produced by Florida TV.

Concept 
The concept of the show includes the classic elements of a late-night talk show such as stand-up, interviews with celebrity guests and a musical appearance. There are also recurring segments and a studio band with different names but actually the band named Gloria and is led by Mark Tavassol. The Florida TV author and producer Jakob Lundt appears as a sidekick.

Show structure 
At the beginning of an episode Heufer-Umlauf performed a traditional stand-up monologue, before changing to a seated. After that one of various recurring segments appears, followed by the first of the episode's guests, which usually include celebrities and actors, literary figures, people in fashion, artists, athletes, and politicians. The guest may return after a second recurring segments and at the episode's end followed by a musical guest.

Production 
Already in July 2017 ProSieben announces a new weekly comedy show with Klaas Heufer-Umlauf for Spring 2018. At the beginning of February 2018 it was finally announced that the late night show named Late Night Berlin premiered on March 12, 2018.

In 2018, Late Night Berlin was not recorded in Berlin as the title suggests. However, since its 3rd season began in 2019, it is now filmed at the eastern side of Berlin. This programme is produced by Florida TV, and its 4th season will be returned on September 23, just after summer break.

In 2021, just before days of 2021 German federal election(on Sept. 26), on September 14, this show has successfully returned into its 8th season. This show is to be broadcast every Tuesday at 22:30.

Episodes

Reception

Ratings

References

External links

German-language television shows
2018 German television series debuts
ProSieben original programming